An automaton is a self-operating machine.

Automaton may also refer to:
 An automaton, an abstract machine in mathematics, computer science, and automata theory, a mathematical model of computer hardware and software
 In particular, a finite-state automaton, an automaton limited to a finite state space

Film and TV
  Automatons (film), a 2006 film

Music
 Automaton (album), Jamiroquai 2017
 Automaton (song), a song by Jamiroquai 2017
 "Automaton", a song by DJ Robotaki 2017
 "Automaton", a song by English indie rock band The Rakes

See also
Automat (disambiguation)
Automata (disambiguation)
Automation (disambiguation)

Other uses
 Automaton Media, a gaming website operated by Active Gaming Media.